CBLN may refer to:

 CBLN-FM, a radio rebroadcaster (98.1 FM) licensed to Nakina, Ontario, Canada, rebroadcasting CBQT-FM
 CBLN-TV, a television retransmitter (channel 23) licensed to London, Ontario, Canada, retransmitting CBLT